Jo Berry may refer to:

Jo Berry (born 1957), British peace activist and public speaker
Jo Berry (actress), Filipino actress